Jody Ridley (born May 19, 1942) is a former NASCAR driver. He won the 1980 NASCAR Winston Cup Rookie of the Year award and one race at Dover International Speedway the next year, the only Cup victory for Donlavey Racing.

His career statistics include 140 career starts, one win, seven top fives, 56 top tens, and two top ten points finishes (fifth in 1981, and seventh in 1980).

In the 1989 Daytona 500, Ridley took over for an injured Bill Elliott, but he would have a hard crash later in the race.

He now resides in Chatsworth, Georgia. He was inducted in the Georgia Racing Hall of Fame in 2007.

Motorsports career results

NASCAR
(key) (Bold – Pole position awarded by qualifying time. Italics – Pole position earned by points standings or practice time. * – Most laps led.)

Winston Cup Series

Daytona 500

Busch Series

References

External links
 
 Biography at the Georgia Racing Hall of Fame (PDF)

Living people
1942 births
People from Chatsworth, Georgia
Racing drivers from Georgia (U.S. state)
NASCAR drivers
American Speed Association drivers
Dale Earnhardt Inc. drivers